The 2007-08 FAW Welsh Cup is the 121st edition of the annual knockout tournament for non-English competitive football teams in Wales. The 2007–08 tournament commenced on 18 August 2007 and concluded on 4 May 2008. The 2007–08 Welsh Cup winner's are Bangor City

Preliminary round
Games were played on 18 August 2007.

First round
Matches played on 15 September 2007.

Second round
Matches played on 6 October 2007.

Third round
Matches played on 3 November 2007.

Fourth round
Matches played on 2 February 2008.

Quarter-finals
Matches were played on 1 March 2008 and 2 March 2008.

Semi-finals
The matches were originally scheduled to be played on the weekend of 29 March 2008, but the Newport YMCA v Bangor City tie was postponed due to a waterlogged pitch. It was eventually played Newtown on the following Saturday. The other tie was played at Aberystwyth Town.

Final

External links
   FAW Welsh Cup, Football Association of Wales.

2007-08
1